Miloš Radosavljević (Serbian Cyrillic: born 20 May 1988 in Smederevo) is a Serbian football midfielder.

Previously he played for Czech side FK Viktoria Žižkov and Polish club Arka Gdynia.

External sources
 Profile at Srbijafudbal.
 Miloš Radosavljević Stats at Utakmica.rs

Living people
1988 births
Sportspeople from Smederevo
Serbian footballers
Association football midfielders
FK Smederevo players
FK Mladi Radnik players
FK Viktoria Žižkov players
Arka Gdynia players
Serbian expatriate footballers
Expatriate footballers in the Czech Republic
Expatriate footballers in Poland
Serbian expatriate sportspeople in Poland